Pierre-Frederic Malevergne or Pierre-Frederic Malavergne and Pierre-Frederic Malovergne (1810, France — 1872, Russian Empire) was a French dancer who worked in Russia. All English-speaking and French-speaking sources call him Malevergne; all Russian-speaking sources call him Malavergne or Malovergne, . The birth name of the dancer name is unknown, he himself preferred to be called by alias Monsieur Frédéric or Frédéric (ru: Фредерик). Of his youth nothing is known.

Monsieur Frédéric received an invitation from the Russian Imperial troupe and arrived to Saint Petersburg in 1831. In these years, Russia has laid the base of culture and arts and invited European experts to aid in this, not skimping on the fees and salaries to Europeans. European specialists have not received compensation in Europe and gladfully visited Russia for big money. Russia's policy was justified, and in the middle of the 19th century Russia already had its own Russian culture, a part of the pan-European culture. Since the travel, Monsieur Frédéric's whole life was in Russia. He was working in Russia for 42 years.

Monsieur Frédéric became a solo performer of many parties in ballets of choreographers Charles Didelot, Alexis-Scipion Blache, Antoine Titus, Marius Petipa. He also became a choreographer. His greatest work was Paquita together with Marius Petipa in 1847, Saint Petersburg (Bolshoi Kamenny Theatre) and 1848, Moscow (Bolshoi Theatre) with Yelena Andreyanova in the main party. Another his well-known work is Le Corsaire en 1858, after Jules Perrot's chorégraphie, Moscow (Bolshoi Theatre) with Praskovya Lebedeva as Medora.

Monsieur Frédéric became the teacher of dance. He taught for many years. Among his students were: Lev Ivanov, Timofei Stukolkin, Marfa Muravyova, Lubov Radina, Alexandra Kammerer etc. In Russia there were two Imperial troupes: in Saint Petersburg and in Moscow, he worked in both, and eventually he was transferred to Moscow. He died in 1872. Some sources attribute his death place to Moscow while other sources state that he died in Saint Petersburg.

His death was seen in Russia as a tragedy—everybody knew him, he had a great value for the Russian ballet. An historian of Russian ballet  wrote (Our ballet: 1673-1899): The art of Choreography suffered a great loss in the face of the deceased in Moscow as a dance teacher in the school, old man Frederick Malovergne (ru: «Хореографическое искусство понесло большую потерю в лице скончавшегося в Москве учителя танцев в школе, старика Фредерика Маловерн»).

References

1810 births
1872 deaths
French male ballet dancers
Male ballet dancers from the Russian Empire
Russian male ballet dancers
Ballet teachers
19th-century French ballet dancers
French emigrants to the Russian Empire
19th-century ballet dancers from the Russian Empire